Public Housing is a 1997 American documentary  film directed by Frederick Wiseman. It records the daily life in the Ida B. Wells public housing development in Chicago, Illinois.

References

External links
 
 

1997 films
1997 documentary films
American documentary films
Documentary films about Chicago
Public housing in Chicago
1990s English-language films
1990s American films